Ozan Akbaba (born 9 June 1982) is a Turkish actor.

Akbaba was born in 1982 in Kars, Turkey. He graduated at Akdeniz University School of Fine Arts with a degree in Interior Architecture and Environmental Design. Aside from his career as an actor, he has composed scores for a number of movies as well. In 2014, he appeared in the music video for Sıla's song "Vaziyetler". In 2015, he began starring in the ATV's Eşkıya Dünyaya Hükümdar Olmaz, portraying the character of İlyas Çakırbeyli.

Filmography

Film 
 ANKA - Murat
 Aman Reis Duymasın - İlyas Çakırbeyli
 Abluka (film)|Abluka - Ali
 Mutlak Adalet - Metin
 Krallar Kulübü
 Kadir ve Kardeşleri - Ali
 Ammar: Cin tarikatı - Kemal
 Sürgün İnek - Selçuk
 Yarım Kalan Mucize - Ruhi Su
 Bir Hikayem Var - Hasan

Short film 
 Bumerang - 2010
 Çatallı Katil
 Heksek
 Karartma
 Kötülük
 Emanet
 Son Sevişme
 Hesaplaşma

Television 
 Kasaba Doktoru - 2022–2023 (Hakan Aydıner/Kemal Demir)
 EDHO - 2015–2022 (İlyas Çakırbeyli)
 Güldür Güldür (Şenol) 
 Poyraz Karayel - 2015 (Taner)
 Arka Sokaklar -2014 (Doktor Veysel) 
 Kuzey Güney - 2012–2013 (Sümer Tezkan)
 Cennetin Sırları - 2011 (Zafer)
 Kavak Yelleri - 2007
 Kırık Kanatlar - 2005

Theatre 
 Arafta Kalanlar
 Gölgeden Işığa Karagöz
 Topuzlu
 Kadınlar da Savaşı Yitirdi
 Ali Ayşe'yi Seviyo
 The Comedy of Errors
 Othello
 Ramazan Eğlence ve Animasyonları
 Margret Kısa filmi Çöplükteki Ayı
 Diş Çürükleri Kırallığı
 Çocuk Parkı
 Yollu
 İnternetten Tanışan Son Çift

References

External links 
 
 

Living people
1982 births
Turkish people of Azerbaijani descent
21st-century Turkish male actors
Turkish male television actors
Turkish male film actors
Turkish male stage actors
Akdeniz University alumni